"Here with Me" is a song by Christian rock band, MercyMe. Written and composed by the band, as well as Peter Kipely, Dan Muckala and Brad Russell, "Here with Me" is a ballad with a musical vibe influenced by worship, pop and rock music; the overall sound has been compared to that of alternative rock band, Coldplay. "Here with Me" lyrically discusses the omnipotence of God.

Released as the lead single from MercyMe's 2004 album, Undone, "Here with Me" attained positive critical reception and peaked at No. 1 on multiple Christian radio chart formats; it also peaked inside the top 40 on several mainstream radio formats. It ranked at No. 16 on the 2000s decade-end Hot Christian Songs and Hot Christian AC charts. The song appeared on WOW Hits 2005.

Background and production
"Here with Me" was written and composed by MercyMe, Dan Muckala, Brad Russell, and Peter Kipley. It was recorded at several locations: Blueberry Hill, Sound Stage, Abbey Road Studios, The Indigo Room, Maximedia, Luminous Sound, and The Schwoodio. Recording was handled by F. Reid Shippen, Mike O'Connor, and Steve Bishir; the strings on the song were arranged by Rob Mathes and recorded by Simon Rhodes at Abbey Road Studios. "Here with Me" was mixed by Shippen and produced by Kipley, while the mastering for the song was handled by Ted Jensen at Sterling Sound.

Composition

"Here with Me" is a ballad with a length of four minutes and nine seconds. It is set in common time in the key of B major, with a moderate tempo of eighty-four beats per minute and a vocal range spanning from B3-F5. Musically, "Here with Me" has been compared to the musical vibe of Coldplay and Robbie Williams. The song is piano-driven, with influences from pop, rock, and worship. It features a musical crescendo that has been described as similar to "I Can Only Imagine". The lyrical content of the song has been described as having a devotional bent, and conveys a theme of God's omnipotence and holiness. "Here with Me" also attempts to comprehend the mystery of God's love.

Reception

Critical reception
"Here with Me" received generally positive reviews from critics. Johnny Joftus of Allmusic commented that "the lush "Here With Me" might be a Robbie Williams pop gem were it not for its devotional bent". David McCreary of CCM Magazine opined on his review of Undone that "One surefire hit is “Here With Me,” the album’s first single ... A captivating piano-driven ballad, the song vividly conveys the wonder of God’s omnipresence and holiness and features a rousing crescendo rivaling that of “Imagine". Russ Breimeier of Christianity Today International commented that the song was "worshipful", also opining that it "struggle[s] with comprehending the mystery and enormity of God's love".

Chart performance
"Here with Me" debuted at No. 40 on the Hot Christian Songs chart for the week of April 3, 2004. The song advanced to No. 10 in its sixth chart week, and to No. 5 in its eight chart week, holding that spot for three consecutive weeks. In its sixteenth chart week, "Here with Me" advanced to its peak of No. 1, holding that spot for eleven consecutive weeks. It dropped to No. 2 in its twenty-seventh chart week, holding that spot for two weeks before returning to No. 1 for two more weeks. "Here with Me" dropped to No. 3 in its thirty-first chart week, and spent a further eight weeks on the chart before dropping out. In all, "Here with Me" spent thirty-nine weeks on the Hot Christian Songs chart, thirteen of them at No. 1. On the Adult Contemporary chart, "Here with Me" debuted at No. 24 for the chart week of May 15, 2004. "Here with Me" advanced to No. 19 in its sixth chart week, holding that spot for three consecutive weeks. In its nineteenth chart week, it advanced to its peak of No. 12, and spent a further seven weeks on the chart before dropping out. In all, "Here with Me" spent twenty-six weeks on the Adult Contemporary chart.

On the Adult Top 40 chart, "Here with Me" debuted at No. 38 for the chart week of August 28, 2004. It spent an additional week on the chart before dropping out, after having spent two weeks on the chart. "Here with Me" also peaked at No. 1 on the Billboard Hot Christian AC chart (spending ten weeks at No. 1), the Radio & Records Christian AC chart (spending seven weeks at No. 1), and the Radio & Records Inspo chart (spending five weeks at No. 1), as well as peaking at No. 2 on the Radio & Records Christian CHR chart. "Here with Me" ranked at No. 4 on the 2004 year-end Hot Christian Singles and Tracks Titles and Hot Christian Adult Contemporary Titles charts, as well as at No. 19 on the year-end Adult Contemporary Singles and Tracks chart. Additionally, it ranked at No. 16 on both the 2000s decade-end Hot Christian Songs and Hot Christian AC charts.

Formats and track listing

US promotional single (INO)
"Here with Me"  – 3:58
"Here with Me (Light Remix)" – 3:58
"Here with Me (Vocal Intro Remix) – 3:49
"Here with Me (Hot Remix)" – 3:58

US promotional single (INO/Curb)
"Here with Me" - 3:58

Charts

Weekly charts

Year-end charts

Decade-end charts

References

MercyMe songs
2004 songs
2004 singles
Songs written by Dan Muckala
Curb Records singles
Songs written by Bart Millard
Songs written by Pete Kipley
2000s ballads